{{DISPLAYTITLE:C16H12O5}}
The molecular formula C16H12O5 (molar mass : 284.27 g/mol; exact mass : 284.068473) may refer to :
 Acacetin, a flavone
 Biochanin A, an isoflavone
 Calycosin, an isoflavone
 Genkwanin, a flavone
 Glycitein, an isoflavone
 5-O-methylgenistein, an isoflavone
 Oroxylin-A, a flavone
 Parietin, a cortical pigment of lichens
 Prunetin, an isoflavone
 Retusin (isoflavone)
 Sappanone A, a homoisiflavanone
 Wogonin, a flavone
 4',7-Dihydroxy-6-methoxyflavone, a flavone